Senator Flowers may refer to:

Charlie Flowers (politician) (born 1939), South Dakota State Senate
Merle Flowers (born 1968), Mississippi State Senate
Richmond Flowers Sr. (1918–2007), Alabama State Senate
Stephanie Flowers (born 1953), Arkansas State Senate